Doss is an unincorporated farming and ranching community at the crossroads juncture of  FM 783 and FM 648 in  northwestern Gillespie County, Texas, United States. It is 19 miles NW of Fredericksburg and 14 miles NE of Harper.  Postal zip code is 78618.  Elevation is 1729 feet.

The U.S. Census for year 2000 shows a total population of 225 
1914 Lange's Mill community population was  150

History
In 1849, the Doss brothers began operating a mill on Threadgill Creek, north of the current site of Doss. The mill was acquired by William F. Lange in 1859, and was operated by him until 1878 when Julius Lange took over the business.. The Doss community  originated at the mill.  The first post office was at Lange's Mill in 1898,  but by 1907 the community was renamed Doss and received its own post office.

Lange's Mill Cemetery

Founding families of Doss, Texas

Thomas C Doss

Sept  8, 1852 Thomas C. Doss was Postmaster of "Fredericksburgh"

John E  Doss

Stonemason Philip Buchmeyer
Buchmeyer
 was the second husband of the  widowed Auguste Lehmann and stepfather to her sons Herman and Willie.   Both children were kidnapped by Apaches.  Willie was released after days, but Herman Lehmann  didn't return for 9 years and became the area's most famous Apache  captive and later adopted son of Comanche Chief Quanah Parker

Climate

Doss experiences a humid subtropical climate, with hot summers and a generally mild winter. Temperatures range from 81 °F (27.2 C) in the summer to 45 °F (7.2 C) during winter.

Demographics
As of the census of 2000 of 2000, there were 225 people

Flora and fauna
Prickly pear cactus, pecan trees, a variety of oak and mesquite trees, and abundant wildflower varieties blanket the Doss area of Gillespie County.

Doss has farm livestock and the armadillo  and Texas horned lizard.  The nature lover will also find
  whitetail deer and birds including spotted towhee, painted bunting, white-crowned sparrow, summer tanager, hummingbird, chickadee, kinglet, goldfinch, warbler, finch and lark sparrow.

Churches
 St.  Peter Lutheran Church founded 1896 under leadership  of Rev. Hugo G.A. Krienke.  1989  dedicated historical marker by Texas Historical Commission.
Squaw Creek  Primitive Baptist Church  constituted 1901 in the Squaw Creek School and Community Building,  Elder S. N. Redford, first pastor.  2002 dedicated historical marker by  Texas  Historical Commission.

Doss  Consolidated Common School District
Designated a Recorded Texas Historic Landmark in 1985.  from State of Texas  states the school was begun in 1884 on Doss-Spring  Creek Road.  1894 land for current site was donated by Tom Nixon, and a  small frame structure was built.  In 1905, a limestone schoolhouse was  built, and in 1927 the present  building was added.

Doss Elementary School   is across the street from St. Peter Lutheran Church.  The K-8 grades have 18  students, 48% male and 52% female, and two teachers.

Every  year the Doss Public school  holds a play performed by the school   children. The little room, grades  Kindergarten through 4th grade, and   the big room, 5th grade through 8th grade,  hold plays. The   presentation is accompanied by a bake sale and  raffle held by the  local  residents and by the Doss 4H members.

Doss Volunteer Fire Department

Doss VFD Fish Fry annual fundraiser is held Labor Day Weekend.

Almost 3,000 pounds of catfish are fried and served up with homemade  potato salad and coleslaw, plus all the trimmings. This benefits the Doss VFD.  Entertainment is provided.  The Doss Volunteer Fire Department moved into its new Fire Station Building in September 2015 after a year long Building project.

Dining, entertainment, accommodations

 Doss General Store and Post Office were formerly run under one roof by Fred Itz (1914–2003) and Ruby Oehler Itz (1917–1990).
 Texas Parks and Wildlife magazine has this to say:

Sadly, the Doss store has closed, but the new Doss Country Store, opened  in 2001, has become a gathering place for hunters in the area. It has a  rock front, and there is a metal roof over the wide, spacious front  porch, which is populated with dogs as often as people. Inside, the counter and tables are  covered with glass plate, under which old newspaper clippings chronicle  local events spanning almost a hundred years.

In 2011 the Doss Country Store was purchased and expanded to include a new feed and hardware store.  The new Store and Restaurant have been featured in Texas Monthly for its good food.  This also closed in 2014.
 

 Hill Top Cafe fashioned out of an old gas station, and boasting of Texas comfort foods, as well as Cajun and Greek cuisine, this little spot on Highway 87 between Fredericksburg and Doss also offers bed and breakfast accommodations and the "Old Garage" meeting room.  Proprietor Johnny Nicholas  is a blues musician who opened the establishment shortly after marrying Brenda.  Live music features "Songwriters in the Round".
 Quiet Hill Ranch  bed and breakfast is a combination spa and dude ranch, with a bird watching observatory catering to wildlife enthusiasts.

Battle of Iwo Jima re-enactment
Welge Ranch in Doss was the site of a re-enactment of Battle of Iwo Jima, sponsored by the National Museum of the Pacific War for the 60th anniversary of the iconic battle.  The event was held on February 19, 2005, ending with the famous raising of the flag on Mount Suribachi — which was re-enacted on top of Welge Point in Doss.

See also

 Adelsverein
 Cherry Spring
 Cherry Springs Dance Hall
 Easter Fire
 Enchanted Rock
 German Texan
 Loyal Valley, Texas
 Sisterdale, Texas
 Texas Hill Country

Footnotes

External links
Texas Escapes, Doss
Lange's Mill Cemetery
Marshall-Meusebach Cemetery
Sattler Cemetery
Squaw Creek Cemetery
St. Peter Lutheran Cemetery

Populated places established in 1849
Unincorporated communities in Texas
Unincorporated communities in Gillespie County, Texas
German-American history
1849 establishments in Texas